L. C. Henderson Greenwood (September 8, 1946September 29, 2013) was an American professional football player who was a defensive end for the Pittsburgh Steelers of the National Football League (NFL).

College career
Born and raised in Canton, Mississippi, Greenwood graduated from Arkansas AM&N (now University of Arkansas at Pine Bluff), where he became a member of the Beta Theta chapter of Phi Beta Sigma fraternity. He was also named the 1968 Ebony All-American defensive lineman in the Southwestern Athletic Conference (SWAC).

NFL career
Greenwood was selected in the tenth round of the 1969 NFL/AFL draft by the Pittsburgh Steelers, who had finished at 2–11–1 the previous season, and replaced head coach Bill Austin with Chuck Noll. In , he became the starting left defensive end. He also led the Steelers six times in sacks with a career total of 78 (an unofficial stat at the time). According to records kept by the Steelers, Greenwood's highest single-season sack total was 11, which he attained in 1974. He further had 14 fumble recoveries in his career, including five in 1971, which tied for the NFL lead.

In Super Bowl IX against the Minnesota Vikings in New Orleans, Greenwood batted down two passes from Fran Tarkenton. The next year against the Dallas Cowboys in Miami, he sacked Roger Staubach four times. Greenwood played in all four of the Steelers' Super Bowl victories (IX, X, XIII, XIV) in the 1970s. Unofficially, he had five sacks in those four title games.

Greenwood was known for wearing gold-colored shoes on the football field, to help announcers distinguish him from the higher-profile Joe Greene. Greenwood was called "Hollywood Bags" because of his desire to become an actor after retiring from football. He was a finalist in the 2005 Pro Football Hall of Fame voting but did not get elected. He was again a finalist in 2006, but was not elected. Greenwood has stated that while he would be honored if he were to be inducted into the Hall of Fame, he would not be upset if he were not elected, feeling that the Steelers already in the Hall (in particular, "Mean Joe" Greene) represent the entire team's accomplishments.

In 1991, Greenwood was named to the Super Bowl Silver Anniversary Team and in 2007 he was named to the Steelers All-Time team.  In 2012, the Professional Football Researchers Association named Greenwood to the PRFA Hall of Very Good Class of 2012.

Death
Greenwood died of kidney failure on September 29, 2013 at UPMC Presbyterian. He was 67 years old.

He was buried at the Priestley Chapel Missionary Baptist Church Cemetery in Canton, Mississippi.

References

External links
 
 Biography as a finalist for the Pro Football Hall of Fame in 2006
 
 

1946 births
2013 deaths
American football defensive ends
Arkansas–Pine Bluff Golden Lions football players
Birmingham Americans players
Pittsburgh Steelers players
American Conference Pro Bowl players
People from Canton, Mississippi
African-American players of American football
Deaths from kidney failure
20th-century African-American sportspeople
21st-century African-American people